Arrow paradox may mean:
 One of Zeno's paradoxes about the impossibility of motion
 Kenneth Arrow's impossibility theorem about social choice and voting
 Arrow information paradox: "its value for the purchaser is not known until he has the information, but then he has in effect acquired it without cost"

See also
 Archer's paradox